was a town located in Kimotsuki District, Kagoshima Prefecture, Japan.

As of 2003, the town had an estimated population of 6,758 and a density of 76.734 persons per km². The total area was 88.06 km².

On March 31, 2005, Nejime, along with the town of Sata (also from Kimotsuki District), was merged to create the town of Minamiōsumi.

External links
 Official website of Minamiōsumi 

Dissolved municipalities of Kagoshima Prefecture